Kandal Stueng is a district (srok) of Kandal Province, Cambodia. The district is subdivided into 23 communes (khums) and 154 villages (phums).

References

External links
Kandal at Royal Government of Cambodia website
Kandal at Ministry of Commerce website

Districts of Kandal province